Khyurekhyur is a rural locality (a selo) in Kochkhyursky Selsoviet, Kurakhsky District, Republic of Dagestan, Russia. The population was 353 as of 2010.

Geography 
Khyurekhyur is located 13 km southwest of Kurakh (the district's administrative centre) by road. Kurakh is the nearest rural locality.

Nationalities 
Lezgins live there.

References 

Rural localities in Kurakhsky District